The 1979 La Flèche Wallonne was the 43rd edition of La Flèche Wallonne cycle race and was held on 10 April 1979. The race started in Esneux and finished in Marcinelle. The race was won by Bernard Hinault of the Renault team.

General classification

References

1979 in road cycling
1979
1979 in Belgian sport
April 1979 sports events in Europe
1979 Super Prestige Pernod